Ida Turay (Born Ida Turmayer; 28 September 1907 – 2 June 1997) was a Hungarian film actress. She was the sister of the actress and singer Clara Tabody.

Selected filmography
 Prisoner Number Seven (1929)
 The New Relative (1934)
 Ida regénye (Romance of Ida) (1934)
 Ez a villa eladó (Villa for Sale) (1935)
 Under Blazing Heavens (1936)
 Pesti mese (Tales of Budapest) (1937)
 Hotel Kikelet (Hotel Springtime) (1937)
 A kölcsönkért kastély (The Borrowed Castle) (1937)
 Rézi Friday (1938)
 Magda Expelled (1938)
 Seven Years Hard Luck (1940)
 Egy szoknya, egy nadrág (One Skirt, One Trousers) (1943)
 Janika (1949)
 Állami Áruház (The State Department Store) (1953)
 The Liar (1961)
 Csínom Palkó (1973)
 Oh, Bloody Life (1984)

External links

1907 births
1997 deaths
Hungarian film actresses
Actresses from Budapest
20th-century Hungarian actresses